Zaur Yurevich Makiev (born 24 March 1992 in RNO-Alania) is a Russian freestyle wrestler of Ossetian heritage, international master of sports in freestyle wrestling, Junior World Champion. Russian nationals 2014 bronze medalist (74 kg). He participated in 2016 European Wrestling Championships.  He was eliminated by Soner Demirtaş of Turkey in the 1/8 finals. In repechage he beat Grigor Grigoryan of Armenia by technical fall (10-0), came back and won the bronze medal, beat Andrzej Sokalski of Poland (11-0).

References

1991 births
Living people
Russian male sport wrestlers
Ossetian people
People from Vladikavkaz
Russian people of Ossetian descent
European Wrestling Championships medalists